Pettin' in the Park may refer to:
"Pettin' in the Park" (song), from the film Gold Diggers of 1933
Pettin' in the Park (film), based on the song